Corey Hooper is a retired American soccer player who played professionally in the Continental Indoor Soccer League and USISL.

Hooper attended and played soccer at The Master's College.  During the 1989–90 Southwest Independent Soccer League season, Hooper played for the Addison Arrows as they won the league title.  It appears he may have continued to play for the Arrows after they moved to Fort Worth to become the Fort Worth Kickers.  In 1993, he signed as a free agent with the Dallas Sidekicks of the Continental Indoor Soccer League.  He won his second league title with the Sidekicks that year.  In 1994, Hooper moved to the Texas Lightning.  He retired in 1995 after tearing his anterior cruciate ligament.

External links
 Dallas Sidekicks: Corey Hooper

References

Living people
1970 births
American soccer players
DFW Tornados players
Dallas Lightning players
Dallas Sidekicks (CISL) players
USISL players
USL Second Division players
Association football midfielders